The Belarusian Rugby Federation is the governing body for rugby in Belarus. It oversees the various national teams and the development of the sport.

The Belarusian Rugby Federation was suspended from World Rugby and Rugby Europe on 28 February 2022 due to the Belarusian government's support for the 2022 Russian invasion of Ukraine.

Leadership

See also
 Rugby union in Belarus
 Belarus national rugby union team

References

External links
Belarusian Rugby Federation

Rugby union in Belarus
Rugby
Rugby union governing bodies in Europe